Colonel Talgat Aidzhanuly Berdigulov (Talǵat Aıdjanuly Berdiǵulov; born March 11, 1974) is a Kazakhstani composer. He is the current director of the Presidential Band of the State Security Service of the Republic of Kazakhstan. He is also concurrently the Senior Director of Music of the Military Band Service. He began his service in the Armed Forces of Kazakhstan as a musician in the military brass band of the Alma-Ata Higher All-Arms Command School (now the Military Institute of the Kazakh Ground Forces). He is a graduate of the Moscow Tchaikovsky Conservatory, where he graduated in 1999. He is the composer of many Kazakh military marches, including the March of Ablai Khan (Марш Аблая Хана). He is also a laureate of national and international music competitions.

He currently lives in Nur-Sultan with his wife and 3 kids.

References

1974 births
Kazakhstani composers
Male composers
Living people
Moscow Conservatory alumni
21st-century conductors (music)
21st-century male musicians